The Dunker House is a historic house in Palo Alto, California. The property has been listed on the National Register of Historic Places since February 19, 1982.

History 
It was built in 1926 for John Dunker and his wife, who were "prominent Palo Alto citizens." The house was designed by architect Birge Clark in the Spanish Colonial Revival style. It was "one of the first two houses" to be designed in this style in Palo Alto. The Dunkers hired Leslie Kiler, a relative, to design the grounds.

See also 

 National Register of Historic Places listings in Santa Clara County, California

References 

Houses in Palo Alto, California
Houses on the National Register of Historic Places in California
National Register of Historic Places in Santa Clara County, California
Mission Revival architecture in California
Houses completed in 1926